The 2017 Liga 3 North Sulawesi season is the third edition of Liga Nusantara North Sulawesi is a qualifying round of the 2017 Liga 3. Persma 1960 Manado were the defending champions, but lost.

Teams
This league is followed by 21 clubs. 

 Group A
 Persma 1960 Manado
 PS Manado
 Mandiri F.C.
 PS Bank Sulut
 Bina Taruna F.C.
 Perstal Talaud
 PS Manguni Manado

 Group B
 Persis Sangihe
 Persitaro Sitaro
 PSMU North Minahasa
 Persbit Bitung
 Persmin Minahasa
 PSKT Tomohon
 Persmitra Southeast Minahasa

 Group C
 Persikokot Kotamubagu
 Persibom Bolaang Mongondow
 Bolsel F.C. (South Bolaang Mongondow)
 Boltim F.C. (East Bolaang Mongondow)
 PS Bintang Muda Matali
 PS Kuda Laut Belang
 Persminsel South Minahasa

References

2017 in Indonesian football
North Sulawesi